was a town in Saihaku District, Tottori Prefecture, Japan.

As of 2003, the town had an estimated population of 7,152 and a density of 183.15 persons per km². The total area was 39.05 km².

On January 1, 2005, Kishimoto, along with the town of Mizokuchi (from Hino District), was merged to create the town of Hōki (in Saihaku District).

External links
Hōki official website 

Dissolved municipalities of Tottori Prefecture
Hōki, Tottori